Toulinquet or Toulinguet may refer to:

Twillingate Islands, the French language name
Twillingate, Newfoundland and Labrador, the main town on the island
Georgina Stirling (1866–1935), Canadian opera singer from Twillingate and known by her stage name Marie Toulinquet
Pointe du Toulinguet, a promontory in Brittany